Chemical is the second single from the Swedish glam metal band Crashdïet's 2010 album Generation Wild. It was released on 19 September and was written by Crashdïet's guitarist Martin Sweet and the band Peep Show's singer Johnny Gunn.

Personnel
Simon Cruz - Vocals, rhythm guitar
Martin Sweet - Lead guitar
Peter London - Bass guitar
Eric Young - drums

External links
Official Crashdiet website

References 

2010 singles
Songs written by Martin Sweet
Crashdïet songs
2010 songs